{{Infobox person
| name               = Kamaleswar Mukherjee
| honorific_suffix   =  M.B.B.S.
| image              = 
| caption            = Mukherjee at the 44th International Film Festival of India
| birth_name         = Kamaleswar  Mukherjee
| birth_date         = October 25
| birth_place        = Kolkata, West Bengal, India
| nationality        = Indian
| alma_mater         = Medical College and Hospital, Kolkata (M.B.B.S.)St. Lawrence High School, Kolkata
| other_names        = 
| occupation         = 
| known_for          = Notobor Notout
Meghe Dhaka TaraChander PaharAmazon Obhijaan
Cockpit 
Password
}}

Kamaleswar Mukherjee, M.B.B.S. is an Indian film director, actor, and physician known for his work in Bengali-language films. Films directed by him include Chander Pahar (2013), Meghe Dhaka Tara (2013), Amazon Obhijaan (2017) Cockpit (2017).

Early life and education
Kamaleswar Mukherjee is a physician by training. He attended St. Lawrence High School, Kolkata and is an alumnus of the Medical College and Hospital, Kolkata, when it was affiliated with the University of Calcutta. He transitioned from the medical profession first to Group Theatre, then to the advertising world, and then to filmmaking. After working as an advertisement filmmaker, Mukherjee wrote dialogues, screenplays, and songs for the film Natobor Not Out (2010).

Career
His directorial debut, the well acclaimed film Uro Chithi was released in 2011. This film interwove 12 text messages with 12 different characters, combining shades of life spanning across 12 months. His next venture was Meghe Dhaka Tara, inspired by the life and works of Bengali filmmaker, Ritwik Ghatak. The film attempts to portray the period of Ghatak's life when he was admitted into a mental asylum for treatment. Meghe Dhaka Tara was a critically acclaimed film in the Bengali film circuit, and it won the International Film Festival of India Centenary award.

His next film was Chander Pahar (2013), based on a novel by Bibhutibhushan Bandyopadhyay. Chander Pahar is the second costliest film made in Bengali language and is still the second biggest blockbuster in the history of Bengali cinema.The film received huge critical acclaim. The adventure film was shot in Africa. Then he made the film Khawto, that deals with the love story of an eminent urban author in self imposed asylum near the sea. In 2017, Mukherjee wrote and directed Amazon Obhijaan, (the sequel to Chander Pahar) - that was the costliest Bengali film ever made. Upon release, it was released in 5 languages. The film grossed above 50 crore after being released and is the highest grossing Bengali film till date. Then he made films such as Cockpit - dealing with the life and journey of a pilot, Good Night City based on the conflict between a psychiatrist and a schizophrenic man, Mukhomukhi - a surreal representation of modern day urban angst and living and Password - a story relating to cybercrime. 

As an actor he has performed in a lot of films. Mukherjee is also a playwright, director and the founder member of Kolkata‐based theatre group Shailushik. He is also trained in photography and computer graphics.

 Filmography 

Web series
Mohomaya (Director,Cameo as doctor) ;Hoichoi Original Series
Dujone (Actor) ;Hoichoi Original Series
Roktopolash (Director,Actor) ;Klikk Original SeriesJohny Bonny (Actor) ;Klikk Original Series

 Bibliography 
 Amazon Obhijaan'' (Graphic novel), 2017, Bee Books

Awards and nominations 
 Centenary Award at International Film Festival of India, Goa 2013 (Meghe Dhaka Tara)
 Silver Crow Pheasant Award for the Best Director at International Film Festival of Kerala, 2013 (Meghe Dhaka Tara)
 NETPAC Award International Film Festival of Kerala, 2013 (Meghe Dhaka Tara)
 Nominated for Filmfare Awards East for Best Director – Bengali - (Chander Pahar)
 Zee Bangla Gourab Somman Award for Best Director - (Chander Pahar)
 Kalakar Awards for Best Director - (Chander Pahar)
 West Bengal Film Journalists' Association Awards for Best Screenplay- Anusandhan (film)

References

External links 
 

Bengali film directors
Living people
Year of birth missing (living people)
Place of birth missing (living people)
University of Calcutta alumni
Film directors from Kolkata
Male actors from Kolkata
21st-century Indian film directors
21st-century Indian male actors
Male actors in Bengali cinema
Indian male film actors